TMJ may refer to:

 Temporomandibular joint connecting the jaw to the skull
 Temporomandibular joint dysfunction, pain in the jaw
 Ten Mile Junction LRT station, a closed Light Rail Transit station in Singapore (LRT station abbreviation: TMJ)
 Tohoku Mathematical Journal
 The Milwaukee Journal, a forerunner newspaper to the current-day Milwaukee Journal Sentinel
 Tunku Mahkota Johor or the Crown Prince of Johor in Malaysia, currently Tunku Ismail Idris
 Too Much Joy, American alternative rock group
 Total metal jacket bullet, a small-arms projectile
 Termez Airport, Uzbekistan, near the Afghan border (IATA code: TMJ)
 Samarokena language of Indonesian Papua (ISO code: tmj)
 WTMJ (AM), a radio station in Milwaukee, Wisconsin known casually as "TMJ"
 WTMJ-TV, an NBC-affiliated television station in Milwaukee, Wisconsin which utilizes the on-air branding of "TMJ4"